{{DISPLAYTITLE:Mathieu group M11}}

In the area of modern algebra known as group theory, the Mathieu group M11 is a sporadic simple group of order
   2432511 = 111098 = 7920.

History and properties
It is the smallest sporadic group and, along with the other four Mathieu groups, the first to be discovered. The Schur multiplier and the outer automorphism group are both trivial.

M11 is a sharply 4-transitive permutation group on 11 objects. It admits many generating sets of permutations, such as the pair (1,2,3,4,5,6,7,8,9,10,11), (3,7,11,8)(4,10,5,6) of permutations used by the GAP computer algebra system.

Representations

M11 has a sharply 4-transitive permutation representation on 11 points. The point stabilizer is sometimes denoted by M10, and is a non-split extension of the form A6.2 (an extension of the group of order 2 by the alternating group A6). This action is the automorphism group of  a Steiner system S(4,5,11). The induced action on unordered pairs of points gives a rank 3 action on 55 points.  

M11 has a 3-transitive permutation representation on 12 points with point stabilizer PSL2(11). The permutation representations on 11 and 12 points can both be seen inside the Mathieu group M12 as two different embeddings of M11 in M12, exchanged by an outer automorphism.

The permutation representation on 11 points gives a complex irreducible representation in 10 dimensions. This is the smallest possible dimension of a faithful complex representation, though there are also two other such representations in 10 dimensions forming a complex conjugate pair. 

M11 has two 5-dimensional irreducible representations over the field with 3 elements, related to the restrictions of 6-dimensional representations of the double cover of M12. These have the smallest dimension of any faithful linear representations of M11 over any field.

Maximal subgroups
There are 5 conjugacy classes of maximal subgroups of M11 as follows:

 M10, order 720, one-point stabilizer in representation of degree 11
 PSL(2,11), order 660, one-point stabilizer in representation of degree 12
 M9:2, order 144, stabilizer of a 9 and 2 partition.
 S5, order 120, orbits of 5 and 6
 Stabilizer of block in the S(4,5,11) Steiner system
 Q:S3, order 48, orbits of 8 and 3
 Centralizer of a quadruple transposition
 Isomorphic to GL(2,3).

Conjugacy classes
The maximum order of any element in M11 is 11. Cycle structures are shown for the representations both of degree 11 and 12.

References

 Reprinted in

External links
 MathWorld: Mathieu Groups
  Atlas of Finite Group Representations: M11

Sporadic groups